Nikoloz Berdzenishvili (1895–1965) was a Soviet and Georgian historian who served as a Vice President of the Georgian Academy of Sciences from 1951 to 1957 and chaired the Department of History at Tbilisi State University from 1946 to 1956.

References
 M. Dumbadze, GSE, volume . 2, page. 336, Tbilisi., 1977

 1895 births
 1965 deaths
20th-century historians from Georgia (country)
Members of the Georgian National Academy of Sciences
Tbilisi State University alumni
Stalin Prize winners
Recipients of the Order of the Red Banner of Labour
Burials at Mtatsminda Pantheon
Soviet historians